Kaarlo Castrén (28 February 1860 – 19 November 1938) was a Finnish politician and Prime Minister of Finland. He represented the National Progressive Party.

Castrén was born in Turtola and graduated in 1887 as a Bachelor of Law. From 1888 to 1892, he worked in the finance division of the Senate of Finland, and from 1888 to 1898 in the Castrén & Snellman attorneys-at-law office.

From 1892 to 1904, Castrén was a member of the board in the Kansallis-Osake-Pankki bank. He attended the state board meetings in 1894 and from 1905 to 1906. He was Senator from 1908 to 1909, after which he founded an attorney-at-law office. In 1916, Castrén was elected as the director of Kansallis-Osake-Pankki.

In November 1918, Castrén was named Minister of Finance. He served as Prime Minister of Finland from 17 April to 15 August 1919. His government gave a proposal of the republic form of government in Finland, and after the proposal was accepted, the government disbanded.

Castrén died in Helsinki.

Cabinets
Kaarlo Castrén Cabinet

References

1860 births
1938 deaths
People from Pello
People from Oulu Province (Grand Duchy of Finland)
Young Finnish Party politicians
National Progressive Party (Finland) politicians
Finnish senators
Prime Ministers of Finland
Ministers of Finance of Finland
Members of the Diet of Finland
19th-century Finnish businesspeople